Dina Louise Epstein, (born 16 July 1965) is a Swedish journalist and author.

Academic studies 
Louise Epstein has studied literary science and history of ideas at Lunds university. She also studied to become a radio producer at Dramatiska Institutet.

Work life

Author 
Epstein is the author of two novels, En trollkarl vittnar inte (1992) and Sju dagar i augusti (1994) both released by the publisher Brombergs.

Radio 
She works at Sveriges Radios culture department and is every year one of the first to comment the announcement of that years Nobel prize winner in Literature.

Since Januari 2011, and along with Thomas Nordegren, Epstein presents the daily show Nordegren & Epstein i P1 at Sveriges Radios P1. The two alternate as host and sidekick.

In late 2014, Epstein and Nordegren teamed up for the entertainment show På spåret broadcast on Sveriges Television.

Bibliography
En trollkarl vittnar inte, Brombergs, Stockholm, 1992,  
Sju dagar i augusti, Brombergs, Stockholm, 1994

References

External links

1965 births
Living people
21st-century Swedish journalists
Swedish women writers
Swedish women journalists
Writers from Malmö
Swedish radio presenters
Swedish women radio presenters
Dramatiska Institutet alumni
Lund University alumni